Orchids are plants that belong to the family Orchidaceae, a diverse and widespread group of flowering plants with blooms that are often colourful and fragrant.

Along with the Asteraceae, the Orchidaceae is one of the two largest families of flowering plants. There about 28,000 currently accepted species, distributed in about 763 genera. The determination of which family is larger is still under debate because verified data on the members of such enormous families are continually in flux. Regardless, the number of orchid species is nearly equal to the number of bony fishes, more than twice the number of bird species, and about four times the number of mammal species.

The family encompasses about 6–11% of all species of seed plants. The largest genera are Bulbophyllum (2,000 species), Epidendrum (1,500 species), Dendrobium (1,400 species) and Pleurothallis (1,000 species). It also includes Vanilla (the genus of the vanilla plant), the type genus Orchis, and many commonly cultivated plants such as Phalaenopsis and Cattleya. Moreover, since the introduction of tropical species into cultivation in the 19th century, horticulturists have produced more than 100,000 hybrids and cultivars.

Description 

Orchids are easily distinguished from other plants, as they share some very evident derived characteristics or synapomorphies. Among these are: bilateral symmetry of the flower (zygomorphism), many resupinate flowers, a nearly always highly modified petal (labellum), fused stamens and carpels, and extremely small seeds.

Stem and roots 

All orchids are perennial herbs that lack any permanent woody structure. They can grow according to two patterns:
 Monopodial: The stem grows from a single bud, leaves are added from the apex each year, and the stem grows longer accordingly. The stem of orchids with a monopodial growth can reach several metres in length, as in Vanda and Vanilla.
 Sympodial: Sympodial orchids have a front (the newest growth) and a back (the oldest growth). The plant produces a series of adjacent shoots, which grow to a certain size, bloom and then stop growing and are replaced. Sympodial orchids grow horizontally, rather than vertically, following the surface of their support. The growth continues by development of new leads, with their own leaves and roots, sprouting from or next to those of the previous year, as in Cattleya. While a new lead is developing, the rhizome may start its growth again from a so-called 'eye', an undeveloped bud, thereby branching. Sympodial orchids may have visible pseudobulbs joined by a rhizome, which creeps along the top or just beneath the soil.

Terrestrial orchids may be rhizomatous or form corms or tubers. The root caps of terrestrial orchids are smooth and white.

Some sympodial terrestrial orchids, such as Orchis and Ophrys, have two subterranean tuberous roots. One is used as a food reserve for wintry periods, and provides for the development of the other one, from which visible growth develops.

In warm and constantly humid climates, many terrestrial orchids do not need pseudobulbs.

Epiphytic orchids, those that grow upon a support, have modified aerial roots that can sometimes be a few meters long. In the older parts of the roots, a modified spongy epidermis, called a velamen, has the function of absorbing humidity. It is made of dead cells and can have a silvery-grey, white or brown appearance. In some orchids, the velamen includes spongy and fibrous bodies near the passage cells, called tilosomes.

The cells of the root epidermis grow at a right angle to the axis of the root to allow them to get a firm grasp on their support. Nutrients for epiphytic orchids mainly come from mineral dust, organic detritus, animal droppings and other substances collecting among on their supporting surfaces.

The base of the stem of sympodial epiphytes, or in some species essentially the entire stem, may be thickened to form a pseudobulb that contains nutrients and water for drier periods.

The pseudobulb has a smooth surface with lengthwise grooves, and can have different shapes, often conical or oblong. Its size is very variable; in some small species of Bulbophyllum, it is no longer than two millimeters, while in the largest orchid in the world, Grammatophyllum speciosum (giant orchid), it can reach three meters. Some Dendrobium species have long, canelike pseudobulbs with short, rounded leaves over the whole length; some other orchids have hidden or extremely small pseudobulbs, completely included inside the leaves.

With ageing the pseudobulb sheds its leaves and becomes dormant. At this stage it is often called a backbulb. Backbulbs still hold nutrition for the plant, but then a pseudobulb usually takes over, exploiting the last reserves accumulated in the backbulb, which eventually dies off, too. A pseudobulb typically lives for about five years. Orchids without noticeable pseudobulbs are also said to have growths, an individual component of a sympodial plant.

Leaves 

Like most monocots, orchids generally have simple leaves with parallel veins, although some Vanilloideae have reticulate venation. Leaves may be ovate, lanceolate, or orbiculate, and very variable in size on the individual plant. Their characteristics are often diagnostic. They are normally alternate on the stem, often folded lengthwise along the centre ("plicate"), and have no stipules. Orchid leaves often have siliceous bodies called stegmata in the vascular bundle sheaths (not present in the Orchidoideae) and are fibrous.

The structure of the leaves corresponds to the specific habitat of the plant. Species that typically bask in sunlight, or grow on sites which can be occasionally very dry, have thick, leathery leaves and the laminae are covered by a waxy cuticle to retain their necessary water supply. Shade-loving species, on the other hand, have long, thin leaves.

The leaves of most orchids are perennial, that is, they live for several years, while others, especially those with plicate leaves as in Catasetum, shed them annually and develop new leaves together with new pseudobulbs.

The leaves of some orchids are considered ornamental. The leaves of Macodes sanderiana, a semiterrestrial or rock-hugging ("lithophyte") orchid, show a sparkling silver and gold veining on a light green background. The cordate leaves of Psychopsis limminghei are light brownish-green with maroon-puce markings, created by flower pigments. The attractive mottle of the leaves of lady's slippers from tropical and subtropical Asia (Paphiopedilum), is caused by uneven distribution of chlorophyll. Also, Phalaenopsis schilleriana is a pastel pink orchid with leaves spotted dark green and light green. The jewel orchid (Ludisia discolor) is grown more for its colorful leaves than its white flowers.

Some orchids, such as Dendrophylax lindenii (ghost orchid), Aphyllorchis and Taeniophyllum depend on their green roots for photosynthesis and lack normally developed leaves, as do all of the heterotrophic species.

Orchids of the genus Corallorhiza (coralroot orchids) lack leaves altogether and instead wrap their roots around the roots of mature trees and use specialized fungi to harvest sugars.

Flowers 
Orchid flowers have three sepals, three petals and a three-chambered ovary. The three sepals and two of the petals are often similar to each other but one petal is usually highly modified, forming a "lip" or labellum. In most orchid genera, as the flower develops, it undergoes a twisting through 180°, called resupination, so that the labellum lies below the column. The labellum functions to attract insects, and in resupinate flowers, also acts as a landing stage, or sometimes a trap.

The reproductive parts of an orchid flower are unique in that the stamens and style are joined to form a single structure, the column. Instead of being released singly, thousands of pollen grains are contained in one or two bundles called pollinia that are attached to a sticky disc near the top of the column. Just below the pollinia is a second, larger sticky plate called the stigma.

Reproduction

Pollination 

The complex mechanisms that orchids have evolved to achieve cross-pollination were investigated by Charles Darwin and described in Fertilisation of Orchids (1862). Orchids have developed highly specialized pollination systems, thus the chances of being pollinated are often scarce, so orchid flowers usually remain receptive for very long periods, rendering unpollinated flowers long-lasting in cultivation. Most orchids deliver pollen in a single mass. Each time pollination succeeds, thousands of ovules can be fertilized.

Pollinators are often visually attracted by the shape and colours of the labellum. However, some Bulbophyllum species attract male fruit flies (Bactrocera and Zeugodacus spp.) solely via a floral chemical which simultaneously acts as a floral reward (e.g. methyl eugenol, raspberry ketone, or zingerone) to perform pollination. The flowers may produce attractive odours. Although absent in most species, nectar may be produced in a spur of the labellum (8 in the illustration above), or on the point of the sepals, or in the septa of the ovary, the most typical position amongst the Asparagales.

In orchids that produce pollinia, pollination happens as some variant of the following sequence: when the pollinator enters into the flower, it touches a viscidium, which promptly sticks to its body, generally on the head or abdomen. While leaving the flower, it pulls the pollinium out of the anther, as it is connected to the viscidium by the caudicle or stipe. The caudicle then bends and the pollinium is moved forwards and downwards. When the pollinator enters another flower of the same species, the pollinium has taken such position that it will stick to the stigma of the second flower, just below the rostellum, pollinating it. In horticulture, artificial orchid pollination is achieved by removing the pollinia with a small instrument such as a toothpick from the pollen parent and transferring them to the seed parent.

Some orchids mainly or totally rely on self-pollination, especially in colder regions where pollinators are particularly rare. The caudicles may dry up if the flower has not been visited by any pollinator, and the pollinia then fall directly on the stigma. Otherwise, the anther may rotate and then enter the stigma cavity of the flower (as in Holcoglossum amesianum).

The slipper orchid Paphiopedilum parishii reproduces by self-fertilization. This occurs when the anther changes from a solid to a liquid state and directly contacts the stigma surface without the aid of any pollinating agent or floral assembly.

The labellum of the Cypripedioideae is poke bonnet-shaped, and has the function of trapping visiting insects. The only exit leads to the anthers that deposit pollen on the visitor.

In some extremely specialized orchids, such as the Eurasian genus Ophrys, the labellum is adapted to have a colour, shape, and odour which attracts male insects via mimicry of a receptive female. Pollination happens as the insect attempts to mate with flowers.

Many neotropical orchids are pollinated by male orchid bees, which visit the flowers to gather volatile chemicals they require to synthesize pheromonal attractants. Males of such species as Euglossa imperialis or Eulaema meriana have been observed to leave their territories periodically to forage for aromatic compounds, such as cineole, to synthesize pheromone for attracting and mating with females. Each type of orchid places the pollinia on a different body part of a different species of bee, so as to enforce proper cross-pollination.

A rare achlorophyllous saprophytic orchid growing entirely underground in Australia, Rhizanthella slateri, is never exposed to light, and depends on ants and other terrestrial insects to pollinate it.

Catasetum, a genus discussed briefly by Darwin, actually launches its viscid pollinia with explosive force when an insect touches a seta, knocking the pollinator off the flower.

After pollination, the sepals and petals fade and wilt, but they usually remain attached to the ovary.

In 2011,  Bulbophyllum nocturnum was discovered to flower nocturnally.

Asexual reproduction  
Some species, such as in the genera Phalaenopsis, Dendrobium, and Vanda, produce offshoots or plantlets formed from one of the nodes along the stem, through the accumulation of growth hormones at that point. These shoots are known as keiki.

Fruits and seeds 

The ovary typically develops into a capsule that is dehiscent by three or six longitudinal slits, while remaining closed at both ends.

The seeds are generally almost microscopic and very numerous, in some species over a million per capsule. After ripening, they blow off like dust particles or spores. Most orchid species lack endosperm in their seed and must enter symbiotic relationships with various mycorrhizal basidiomyceteous fungi that provide them the necessary nutrients to germinate, so almost all orchid species are mycoheterotrophic during germination and reliant upon fungi to complete their lifecycles. Only a handful of orchid species have seed that can germinate without mycorrhiza, namely the species within the genus Disa with hydrochorous seeds.

As the chance for a seed to meet a suitable fungus is very small, only a minute fraction of all the seeds released grow into adult plants. In cultivation, germination typically takes weeks.

Horticultural techniques have been devised for germinating orchid seeds on an artificial nutrient medium, eliminating the requirement of the fungus for germination and greatly aiding the propagation of ornamental orchids. The usual medium for the sowing of orchids in artificial conditions is agar gel combined with a carbohydrate energy source. The carbohydrate source can be combinations of discrete sugars or can be derived from other sources such as banana, pineapple, peach, or even tomato puree or coconut water. After the preparation of the agar medium, it is poured into test tubes or jars which are then autoclaved (or cooked in a pressure cooker) to sterilize the medium. After cooking, the medium begins to gel as it cools.

Taxonomy 

The taxonomy of this family is in constant flux, as new studies continue to clarify the relationships between species and groups of species, allowing more taxa at several ranks to be recognized. The Orchidaceae is currently placed in the order Asparagales by the APG III system of 2009.

Five subfamilies are recognised. The cladogram below was made according to the APG system of 1998. It represents the view that most botanists had held up to that time. It was supported by morphological studies, but never received strong support in molecular phylogenetic studies.

In 2015, a phylogenetic study showed strong statistical support for the following topology of the orchid tree, using 9 kb of plastid and nuclear DNA from 7 genes, a topology that was confirmed by a phylogenomic study in the same year.

Evolution 

A study in the scientific journal Nature has hypothesised that the origin of orchids goes back much longer than originally expected. An extinct species of stingless bee, Proplebeia dominicana, was found trapped in Miocene amber from about 15-20 million years ago. The bee was carrying pollen of a previously unknown orchid taxon, Meliorchis caribea, on its wings. This find is the first evidence of fossilised orchids to date and shows insects were active pollinators of orchids then. This extinct orchid, M. caribea, has been placed within the extant tribe Cranichideae, subtribe Goodyerinae (subfamily Orchidoideae). An even older orchid species, Succinanthera baltica, was described from the Eocene Baltic amber by Poinar & Rasmussen (2017).

Genetic sequencing indicates orchids may have arisen earlier, 76 to 84 million years ago during the Late Cretaceous. According to Mark W. Chase et al. (2001), the overall biogeography and phylogenetic patterns of Orchidaceae show they are even older and may go back roughly 100 million years.

Using the molecular clock method, it was possible to determine the age of the major branches of the orchid family. This also confirmed that the subfamily Vanilloideae is a branch at the basal dichotomy of the monandrous orchids, and must have evolved very early in the evolution of the family. Since this subfamily occurs worldwide in tropical and subtropical regions, from tropical America to tropical Asia, New Guinea and West Africa, and the continents began to split about 100 million years ago, significant biotic exchange must have occurred after this split (since the age of Vanilla is estimated at 60 to 70 million years).

Genome duplication occurred prior to the divergence of this taxon.

Genera 

There are around 800 genera of orchids. The following are amongst the most notable genera of the orchid family:

 Aa
 Abdominea
 Acampe
 Acanthophippium
 Aceratorchis
 Acianthus
 Acineta
 Acrorchis
 Ada
 Aerangis
 Aeranthes
 Aerides
 Aganisia
 Agrostophyllum
 Anacamptis
 Ancistrochilus
 Angraecum
 Anguloa
 Ansellia
 Aorchis
 Aplectrum
 Arachnis
 Arethusa
 Armodorum
 Ascoglossum
 Australorchis
 Auxopus
 Baptistonia
 Barkeria
 Bartholina
 Beloglottis
 Biermannia
 Bletilla
 Brassavola
 Brassia
 Bulbophyllum
 Calanthe
 Calypso
 Catasetum
 Cattleya
 Chiloschista
 Cirrhopetalum
 Cleisostoma
 Clowesia
 Coelogyne
 Coryanthes
 Cycnoches
 Cymbidium
 Cyrtopodium
 Cypripedium
 Dactylorhiza
 Dendrobium
 Disa
 Dracula
 Encyclia
 Epidendrum
 Epipactis
 Eria
 Eulophia
 Gastrochilus
 Gongora
 Goodyera
 Grammatophyllum
 Gymnadenia
 Habenaria
 Herschelia
 Ionopsis
 Laelia
 Lepanthes
 Liparis
 Ludisia
 Lycaste
 Masdevallia
 Maxillaria
 Meliorchis
 Mexipedium
 Miltonia
 Mormodes
 Odontoglossum
 Oeceoclades
 Oncidium
 Ophrys
 Orchis
 Paphiopedilum
 Papilionanthe
 Paraphalaenopsis
 Peristeria
 Phaius
 Phalaenopsis
 Pholidota
 Phragmipedium
 Platanthera
 Platystele
 Pleione
 Pleurothallis
 Pomatocalpa
 Promenaea
 Pterostylis
 Renanthera
 Restrepia
 Restrepiella
 Rhynchostylis
 Roezliella
 Saccolabium
 Sarcochilus
 Satyrium
 Seidenfadenia
 Selenipedium
 Serapias
 Sobralia
 Spiranthes
 Stanhopea
 Stelis
 Thrixspermum
 Tolumnia
 Trias
 Trichocentrum
 Trichoglottis
 Vanda
 Vanilla
 Yoania
 Zeuxine
 Zygopetalum

Etymology 

The type genus (i.e. the genus after which the family is named) is Orchis. The genus name comes from the Ancient Greek , literally meaning "testicle", because of the shape of the twin tubers in some species of Orchis. The term "orchid" was introduced in 1845 by John Lindley in School Botany, as a shortened form of Orchidaceae.

In Middle English, the name bollockwort was used for some orchids, based on "bollock" meaning testicle and "wort" meaning plant.

Hybrids 
Orchid species hybridize readily in cultivation, leading to a large number of hybrids with complex naming.  Hybridization is possible across genera, and therefore many cultivated orchids are placed into nothogenera.  For instance, the nothogenus × Brassocattleya is used for all hybrids of species from the genera Brassavola and Cattleya.  Nothogenera based on at least three genera may have names based on a person's name with the suffix -ara, for instance × Colmanara = Miltonia × Odontoglossum × Oncidium.  (The suffix is obligatory starting at four genera.)

Cultivated hybrids in the orchid family are also special in that they are named by using grex nomenclature, rather than nothospecies.  For instance, hybrids between Brassavola nodosa and Brassavola acaulis are placed in the grex Brassavola Guiseppi. The name of the grex ("Guiseppi" in this example) is written in a non-italic font without quotes.

Abbreviations 
As a unique feature of the orchid family, a system of abbreviations exists that applies to names of genera and nothogenera.  The system is maintained by the Royal Horticultural Society.  These abbreviations consist of at least one character, but may be longer.  As opposed to the usual one-letter abbreviations used for names of genera, orchid abbreviations uniquely determine the (notho)genus.  They are widely used in cultivation.  Examples are Phal for Phalaenopsis, V for Vanda and Cleis for Cleisostoma.

Distribution 
Orchidaceae are cosmopolitan, occurring in almost every habitat apart from glaciers. The world's richest diversity of orchid genera and species is found in the tropics, but they are also found above the Arctic Circle, in southern Patagonia, and two species of Nematoceras on Macquarie Island at 54° south.

The following list gives a rough overview of their distribution:
 Oceania: 50 to 70 genera
 North America: 20 to 26 genera
 tropical America: 212 to 250 genera
 tropical Asia: 260 to 300 genera
 tropical Africa: 230 to 270 genera
 Europe and temperate Asia: 40 to 60 genera

Ecology 

A majority of orchids are perennial epiphytes, which grow anchored to trees or shrubs in the tropics and subtropics. Species such as Angraecum sororium are lithophytes, growing on rocks or very rocky soil. Other orchids (including the majority of temperate Orchidaceae) are terrestrial and can be found in habitat areas such as grasslands or forest.

Some orchids, such as Neottia and Corallorhiza, lack chlorophyll, so are unable to photosynthesise. Instead, these species obtain energy and nutrients by parasitising soil fungi through the formation of orchid mycorrhizae. The fungi involved include those that form ectomycorrhizas with trees and other woody plants, parasites such as Armillaria, and saprotrophs. These orchids are known as myco-heterotrophs, but were formerly (incorrectly) described as saprophytes as it was believed they gained their nutrition by breaking down organic matter. While only a few species are achlorophyllous holoparasites, all orchids are myco-heterotrophic during germination and seedling growth, and even photosynthetic adult plants may continue to obtain carbon from their mycorrhizal fungi. The symbiosis is typically maintained throughout the lifetime of the orchid because they depend on the fungus for nutrients, sugars and minerals. However, some orchids have been found to switch fungal partners during extreme conditions.

Uses

Perfumery 
The scent of orchids is frequently analysed by perfumers (using headspace technology and gas-liquid chromatography/mass spectrometry) to identify potential fragrance chemicals.

Horticulture 
The other important use of orchids is their cultivation for the enjoyment of the flowers. Most cultivated orchids are tropical or subtropical, but quite a few that grow in colder climates can be found on the market. Temperate species available at nurseries include Ophrys apifera (bee orchid), Gymnadenia conopsea (fragrant orchid), Anacamptis pyramidalis (pyramidal orchid) and Dactylorhiza fuchsii (common spotted orchid).

Orchids of all types have also often been sought by collectors of both species and hybrids. Many hundreds of societies and clubs worldwide have been established. These can be small, local clubs, or larger, national organisations such as the American Orchid Society. Both serve to encourage cultivation and collection of orchids, but some go further by concentrating on conservation or research.

The term "botanical orchid" loosely denotes those small-flowered, tropical orchids belonging to several genera that do not fit into the "florist" orchid category. A few of these genera contain enormous numbers of species. Some, such as Pleurothallis and Bulbophyllum, contain approximately 1700 and 2000 species, respectively, and are often extremely vegetatively diverse. The primary use of the term is among orchid hobbyists wishing to describe unusual species they grow, though it is also used to distinguish naturally occurring orchid species from horticulturally created hybrids.

New orchids are registered with the International Orchid Register, maintained by the Royal Horticultural Society.

Food 

The dried seed pods of one orchid genus, Vanilla (especially Vanilla planifolia), are commercially important as a flavouring in baking, for perfume manufacture and aromatherapy.

The underground tubers of terrestrial orchids [mainly Orchis mascula (early purple orchid)] are ground to a powder and used for cooking, such as in the hot beverage salep or in the Turkish mastic ice cream dondurma. The name salep has been claimed to come from the Arabic expression , "fox testicles", but it appears more likely the name comes directly from the Arabic name . The similarity in appearance to testes naturally accounts for salep being considered an aphrodisiac.

The dried leaves of Jumellea fragrans are used to flavour rum on Reunion Island.

Some saprophytic orchid species of the group Gastrodia produce potato-like tubers and were consumed as food by native peoples in Australia and can be successfully cultivated, notably Gastrodia sesamoides. Wild stands of these plants can still be found in the same areas as early Aboriginal settlements, such as Ku-ring-gai Chase National Park in Australia. Aboriginal peoples located the plants in habitat by observing where bandicoots had scratched in search of the tubers after detecting the plants underground by scent.

Cultural symbolism 
Orchids have many associations with symbolic values. For example, the orchid is the City Flower of Shaoxing, China. Cattleya mossiae is the national Venezuelan flower, while Cattleya trianae is the national flower of Colombia. Vanda Miss Joaquim is the national flower of Singapore, Guarianthe skinneri is the national flower of Costa Rica and Rhyncholaelia digbyana is the national flower of Honduras. Prosthechea cochleata is the national flower of Belize, where it is known as the black orchid. Lycaste skinneri has a white variety (alba) that is the national flower of Guatemala, commonly known as Monja Blanca (White Nun). Panama's national flower is the Holy Ghost orchid (Peristeria elata), or 'the flor del Espiritu Santo'. Rhynchostylis retusa is the state flower of the Indian state of Assam where it is known as Kopou Phul.

Orchids native to the Mediterranean are depicted on the Ara Pacis in Rome, until now the only known instance of orchids in ancient art, and the earliest in European art. A French writer and agronomist, Louis Liger, invented a classical myth in his book Le Jardinier Fleuriste et Historiographe published in 1704, attributing it to the ancient Greeks and Romans, in which Orchis the son of a nymph and a satyr rapes a priestess of Bacchus during one of his festivals the Bacchanalia and is then killed and transformed into an orchid flower as punishment by the gods, paralleling the various myths of youths dying and becoming flowers, like Adonis and Narcisuss; this myth however does not appear any earlier than Liger, and is not part of traditional Greek and Roman mythologies.

Conservation
Almost all orchids are included in Appendix II of the Convention on International Trade in Endangered Species (CITES), meaning that international trade (including in their parts/derivatives) is regulated by the CITES permit system. A smaller number of orchids such as Paphiopedilum sp. are listed in CITES Appendix I meaning that commercial international trade in wild-sourced specimens is prohibited and all other trade is strictly controlled.

Assisted migration as conservation tool 
In 2006 the Longtan Dam was constructed at the Hongshui River, near the Yachang Orchid Nature Reserve. In response to threats of inundation of wild orchids at lower altitudes (350-400 m above sea level), 1000 endangered orchid plants of 16 genera and 29 species were translocated to higher elevation (approximately 1000 m above sea level). After relocation the 5 year survival of low and wide elevation species did not significantly differ and the mortality due to transplant shock was at only 10%. From this it was concluded that assisted migration might be a viable conservation tool for orchid species endangered by climate change.

See also 

 Adaptation (film), based on The Orchid Thief
 Distribution of orchid species
 Orchid Conservation Coalition
 Orchid Pavilion Gathering
 Orchidelirium, the Victorian era of flower madness in which collecting and discovering orchids reached extraordinary levels
 Orchids of the Philippines
 Orchids of Western Australia
 Shangsi Festival
 Black rot on orchids
 List of taxa named after human genitals

Notes

References

Bibliography

External links 

Orchidaceae observations at iNaturalist
Orchidaceae at The Plant List
 Orchidaceae at the Angiosperm Phylogeny Website
 World checklist of Orchidaceae species from the Catalogue of Life, 29,572 species supplied by World Checklist of Selected Plant Families (R. Govaerts & al.)
 Orchidaceae at the online Flora of North America
 Orchidaceae at the online Flora of China
 Orchidaceae at the online Flora of Zimbabwe
 Orchidaceae at the online Flora of the Western Australian
 Orchidaceae at the online Flora of New Zealand
 The Global Orchid Information Network
 Orchid Conservation Coalition
 

 
Extant Campanian first appearances